An election to Roscommon County Council took place on 11 June 2004 as part of that year's Irish local elections. 26 councillors were elected from six electoral divisions by PR-STV voting for a five-year term of office.

Results by party

Results by Electoral Area

Athlone

Ballaghadreen

Boyle

Castlerea

Roscommon

Strokestown

External links
 Official website

2004 Irish local elections
2004